Robbery Under Arms is a 1985 Australian action adventure film starring Sam Neill as bushranger Captain Starlight. Joined by bush larrikin, Ben Marston (Ed Devereaux), and Ben's two adventure-hungry sons (Steven Vidler and Christopher Cummins), Starlight leads his gang of wild colonial boys in search of riches, romance – and other men's cattle.

There were two versions shot simultaneously – a feature film and a TV mini series. They were based on the 1888 novel of the same name by Rolf Boldrewood.

Cast
 Sam Neill as Captain Starlight
 Steven Vidler as Dick Marston
 Christopher Cummins as Jim Marston
 Liz Newman as Gracey
 Jane Menelaus as Aileen
 Andy Anderson as George
 Deborah Coulls as Kate
 Susie Lindeman as Jeannie
 Elaine Cusick as Mum
 Ed Devereaux as Ben
 Tommy Lewis as Warrigal
 Robert Grubb as Sir Frederick Morringer
 David Bradshaw as Goring
 John Dick as Trooper Fall
 Michael Duffield as Mr. Falkland
 Keith Smith as Trooper Spring
 David Jobling as Rourke Bounty Hunter

Production
Jock Blair first had the idea to remake the story in 1981 when he was working at the South Australian Film Corporation. It was originally envisioned that it would be a mini series but it was budgeted at a million dollars an hour which was felt to be too expensive. So it was decided to make a film as well at the same time, based on separate scripts.

There were two writers and two directors. Writing the script took two years.

The film was shot partly on location in the Flinders Rangers and at the SAFC studios in Adelaide. The two directors collaborated well together, and Ken Hannam was relieved to work with the SAFC again after the difficulties on Sunday Too Far Away.

Production took 20 weeks.

Box office
Robbery Under Arms grossed $226,648 at the box office in Australia.

See also
Cinema of Australia

References

External links

 
 
Robbert Under Arms at Australian Screen Online
Mini series version at Oz Movies
Feature film version at Oz Movies

Films based on Robbery Under Arms
Television shows set in colonial Australia
1985 films
Films shot in Flinders Ranges
ITC Entertainment films
1980s Australian television miniseries
English-language television shows
1985 Australian television series debuts
1985 Australian television series endings
Films directed by Ken Hannam
Films directed by Donald Crombie
1980s English-language films